Jon Caldara is an American libertarian activist who serves as the president of the Independence Institute. He is a radio host and has a current events show, Devil's Advocate with Jon Caldara, that airs on KBDI-TV PBS 12 in Denver, Colorado.

Early life and education
Caldara was born in Trenton, New Jersey. His family moved to Colorado when he was six years old. He graduated from Heritage High School and the University of Colorado Boulder. While in college, he drew a comic strip called B Street. After college, Caldara worked as a roadie setting up stage equipment for rock bands. He later started a stage lighting business.

Public policy career
Caldara was elected to the board of directors for the Regional Transportation District, eventually becoming chairman. He replaced Tom Tancredo as president of the Independence Institute, a Colorado think tank, in 1998.

Voter registration protest
When the Colorado legislature relaxed voter registration requirements to allowed people to register in a jurisdiction if they declared their intent to move there, Caldara objected. He decided to test the law by declaring his intent to move to Colorado Springs (Caldara is a long-time resident of Boulder, Colorado) in order to vote in a recall election there. In September 2013, Caldara cast a blank ballot, but never moved to Colorado Springs, although he sublet a room there for a brief time.

Colorado Attorney General John Suthers investigated Caldara for voting fraud, but decided against prosecuting him. Suthers called the incident "suspicious," and said that it was questionable that Caldara ever intended to become an El Paso County resident. However, Suthers noted "arguable ambiguity” in the same-day voter law, and took no action. Caldara’s answer to his critics was: "I told you what I did was legal, neener-neener-neener."

Personal life
Caldara is the father of three children, one of whom died of cancer when she was one year old. His son has Down syndrome.

See also
 Roe Award

References

External links
 
 Jon Caldara biography
 Jon Caldara on Ballotpedia

Living people
American libertarians
Radio personalities from Colorado
People from Boulder, Colorado
People from Trenton, New Jersey
Year of birth missing (living people)